Japonicrambus bilineatus is a moth in the family Crambidae. It was described by Okano in 1957. It is found in Japan (Honshu).

References

Crambinae
Moths described in 1957